Dusty... Definitely is the fourth studio album by singer Dusty Springfield, recorded and released in the UK in 1968. Production credits go to both John Franz, and for the first time, Springfield herself. The songs on this album were chosen because Springfield "liked them", as stated in the liner notes. Like the vast majority of her LPs, the album shows a diverse range of styles ranging from soul ("Take Another Little Piece of my Heart"), pop ("This Girl's in Love With You"), folk ("Morning (Bom Dia)") to lounge ("Who (Will Take my Place?)").

The two sides of the album reflected very different moods: the first side was packed with fast-paced, louder numbers, while the second side was more mellow, which Springfield suggested would be suitable for listening to at night.

The album was a moderate success and eventually entered the UK album's charts in the week ending 21 December 1968 debuting at No.38 and peaking at No.30 the following week and stayed at No.30 for two weeks until eventually dropping 10 places to No.40 the following week but then rose again to No.36 the following week which remained at No.36 for two weeks and then left the charts. Meaning it stayed in the charts for six weeks. This may have been in part with the fact that her top 10 single 'Son Of A Preacher Man was in the charts at the same time and was being promoted by Dusty in the US and other European countries. However it got to No.8 on the NME year end charts for best albums of 1968.

In 1968, Springfield entered into a contract with Atlantic Records for the United States, which meant that the singer had a different record label for each side of the Atlantic (previously she had been signed to Philips both in the UK and the USA). Springfield's new contract allowed Philips in the UK to release American recordings and Atlantic in the USA to release British recordings. This was the first LP to be covered by this agreement. Atlantic was, however, reluctant to release any British recordings on their label; thus, the album was never released in the States.

Tracks from this album were finally released in the USA in 1999 (the year of Springfield's death) on the Rhino Records compilation Dusty in London.

In the UK Dusty... Definitely was first released to CD by Philips Records/PolyGram in the early 1990s and in 2001 Mercury Records/Universal Music Group re-released a digitally remastered edition with four bonus tracks.

Track listing

Side A
"Ain't No Sun Since You've Been Gone" (Sylvia Moy, Norman Whitfield, Cornelius Grant) – 2:46
"Take Another Little Piece of My Heart" (Bert Berns, Jerry Ragovoy) – 2:36
"Another Night" (Burt Bacharach, Hal David) – 2:13
"Mr Dream Merchant" (Jerry Ross, Larry Weiss) – 3:04
"I Can't Give Back the Love I Feel for You" (Nickolas Ashford, Valerie Simpson, Brian Holland) – 2:32
 Note: 2001 CD-reissue erroneously includes the 1998 remix of the track
"Love Power" (Teddy Vann) – 2:09

Side B
"This Girl's in Love with You" (Burt Bacharach, Hal David) – 3:37
"I Only Wanna Laugh" (William Shannon, Shannon Shor) – 3:06
"Who (Will Take My Place)?" (Charles Aznavour, Herbert Kretzmer) – 3:04
"I Think It's Gonna Rain Today" (Randy Newman) – 3:14
"Morning (Bom Dia)" (Nana Caymmi, Gilberto Gil, Norma Tanega) – 2:46
"Second Time Around" (Sammy Cahn, Jimmy Van Heusen) – 3:41

Bonus tracks 2001 CD re-issue
"No Stranger Am I" (Norma Tanega) – 2:46
 First UK release: Philips single BF 1682 (B-side of "I Close My Eyes and Count to Ten"). Release date: 28 June 1968.
"Meditation (Meditação)" (Antônio Carlos Jobim, Newton Mendonça, Norman Gimbel) – 1:58
 Outtake from the Dusty... Definitely sessions. First release: UK 4-CD box set The Legend of Dusty Springfield, 1994.
"The Colour of Your Eyes" (Remix) (Molly McKernan, Norma Tanega) – 2:33
 First UK release (Original mix): Philips single BF 1706 (B-side of "I Will Come to You"). Release date: 20 September 1968.
"Spooky" (Buddy Buie, James B. Cobb, Harry Middlebrooks Jr., Mike Shapiro) – 2:44
 First UK release: Philips single 6006 045 (B-side of "How Can I Be Sure"). Release date: 4 September 1970. (Note: recording date: 24 January 1968).

 Producer tracks 13–16: Johnny Franz.

Other Tracks

"Sweet Lover No More" (David L. Frishberg) – 1:54
 Outtake from the Dusty... Definitely sessions. First release: UK 4-CD box set The Legend of Dusty Springfield, 13 June 1994. Producer: Johnny Franz.

Personnel and production
 Dusty Springfield – lead vocals, backing vocals, production
 Lesley Duncan – backing vocals
 Madeline Bell – backing vocals
 Kay Garner – backing vocals
 John Paul Jones – musical arranger & orchestra conductor, bass
 Keith Mansfield – musical arranger & orchestra conductor
 Peter Knight – orchestra conductor
 Derek Wadsworth – musical arranger
 Jim Tyler – musical arranger
 Johnny Franz – record producer
 Roger Wake – digital remastering/remix (2001 re-issue)
 Mike Gill – digital remastering/remix (2001 re-issue)

References
 Howes, Paul (2001). The Complete Dusty Springfield. London: Reynolds & Hearn Ltd. .
 Howes, Paul (2007). The Complete Dusty Springfield (Revised and expanded edition).

Dusty Springfield albums
1968 albums
Philips Records albums
Albums produced by Johnny Franz
Albums produced by Dusty Springfield
PolyGram albums
Mercury Records albums
Albums arranged by John Paul Jones (musician)
Albums conducted by John Paul Jones (musician)
Albums arranged by Peter Mansfield
Albums conducted by Peter Mansfield
Albums conducted by Peter Knight (composer)